Lárus Johnsen (12 September 1923 – 26 August 2006) was an Icelandic chess player, Icelandic Chess Championship winner (1951).

Biography
From the early 1950s to mid-1960s, Lárus Johnsen was one of the leading Icelandic chess players. He played mainly in domestic chess tournaments and Icelandic Chess Championships. In 1951, Lárus Johnsen won the Icelandic Chess Championship. In 1963, he participated in Nordic Chess Championship.

Lárus Johnsen played for Iceland in the Chess Olympiad:
 In 1952, at third board in the 10th Chess Olympiad in Helsinki (+2, =4, -5).

References

External links

Lárus Johnsen chess games at 365chess.com

1923 births
2006 deaths
Icelandic chess players
Chess Olympiad competitors
20th-century chess players